Wilson Brown may refer to:

 Wilson Brown (admiral) (1882–1957), American World War I and II naval commander
 Wilson Brown (Medal of Honor) (1841–1900), American Civil War sailor
 Wilson Brown (politician) (1804–1855), Missouri lieutenant governor, 1853–1855
 Wilson W. Brown (1837–1916), American soldier and recipient of the Medal of Honor